Arrigo Boldrini (6 September 1915 – 22 January 2008) was an Italian politician and partisan, one of the most prominent figures of the Italian resistance movement, president of National Association of Italian Partisans for almost 60 years.

Biography

During the Resistance 

In 1943, Boldrini joined the then clandestine Italian Communist Party and has been one of the main promoters of the Resistance in Romagna. During the Resistance, Boldrini was the National Liberation Committee's reference man of Ravenna and leader of the  28th Garibaldi Brigade entitled to the partisan "Mario Gordini". During the Nazi-Fascist occupation, Boldrini was always at the forefront during the liberation missions in Romagna and was nicknamed Bulow, an homage to Prussian general Friedrich Wilhelm Freiherr von Bülow.

In 1945, some days immediately after the end of the war, his Brigade was still active in an area where had place a massacre of over 130 surrendered RSI soldiers and some former fascist civilians in Codevigo: in the last years he was indicated by revisionist researchers as the principal instigator of the crime, but in early post-war investigations Boldrini had already been acquitted of the same charges before trial, as it was demonstrated that the massacre was carried "... outside and against his orders and without his knowledge ...", and it's testified that he was elsewhere in the days of the massacre.

After the War 
Boldrini has embodied the ethical and political motives behind the struggle of the Italian Resistance, becoming one of the most authoritative and credible representatives at the institutional level: after being elected to the Constituent Assembly, Boldrini became the first President of the National Association of Italian Partisans, holding this office from 1947 to 2006.

Boldrini has been later elected to the Chamber of Deputies from 1948 to 1972 and to the Senate from 1972 to 1992, being a member of the Parliament uninterruptedly from 1948 to 1994.

In 1991, Boldrini joined the Democratic Party of the Left, and in 1998 he joined the Democrats of the Left until he decided to leave politics in 2005.

He died in his hometown Ravenna on 22 January 2008, at the age of 92.

Electoral history

References

External links 
Files about his parliamentary activities (in Italian): I, II, III, IV, V, VI, VII, VIII, IX, X, XI legislature.

1915 births
2008 deaths
People from Ravenna
Italian partisans
Italian Communist Party politicians
20th-century Italian politicians
21st-century Italian politicians